Choreutis antiptila is a moth in the family Choreutidae. It was described by Edward Meyrick in 1912. It is found in Hainan province of China, Nepal and Tien-mu-shan.

References

Choreutis
Moths described in 1912
Taxa named by Edward Meyrick